Venicia Reid (born 28 October 1987) is a Jamaican footballer who plays as midfielder or a forward. She was a member of the Jamaica women's national team.

International goals
Scores and results list Jamaica's goal tally first

External links 
 

1987 births
Living people
Jamaican women's footballers
Sportspeople from Kingston, Jamaica
Women's association football midfielders
Women's association football forwards
Jamaica women's international footballers
Footballers at the 2007 Pan American Games
Pan American Games competitors for Jamaica
Navarro Bulldogs soccer players
College women's soccer players in the United States
South Florida Bulls women's soccer players
Jamaican expatriate women's footballers
Jamaican expatriate sportspeople in the United States
Expatriate women's soccer players in the United States